The Upper Palatinate Jura, also called the Upper Palatine Jura is the part of the Franconian Jura. The main part is located in Upper Palatinate in Bavaria, Germany. It extends over the districts of Amberg-Sulzbach, Neumarkt, the east of Nürnberger Land, small part in the west of Schwandorf the northwest of Regensburg and north of Kelheim.

References

Literature 
 Dietz, Christian and Andreas Kiefer (2016). Bats of Britain and Europe. London & NY: Bloomsbury.
 Walentowski, Helge, Gregor Aas, Alexander Göllner, Lisa Ahl and Martin Feulner (2018). Phytosociological studies of Malus sylvestris in North Hesse and Upper Franconia, Germany. Göttingen: Tuexenia.

Geography of Bavaria
Franconian Jura